Pycna is a genus of cicadas from Africa and Asia.

List of species
 Pycna coelestia Distant, 1904
 Pycna repanda
 Pycna semiclara (Germar, 1834)
 Pycna sylvia Distant, 1899 (Synonym of Platypleura sylvia)
 Pycna verna Hayashi, 1982

References

Hemiptera of Africa
Hemiptera of Asia
Taxa named by Jean Guillaume Audinet-Serville
Taxa named by Charles Jean-Baptiste Amyot
Cicadidae genera
Platypleurini